Styhead Tarn is a tarn in the English Lake District, near the top of the Sty Head pass, at the head of Borrowdale. It is on the route from Wasdale to Borrowdale, and is therefore a well visited point in the Lake District. It is also passed by walkers ascending Scafell Pike from Borrowdale via the Corridor Route. It is permissible to fish the tarn which contains wild brown trout.

The Styhead Gill is the tarn's outlet which flows into the River Derwent.

Although no official confirmation yet exists, Styhead Tarn is believed to hold the English record for the highest monthly rainfall total, at about 1430 mm in November 2009.

References

Lakes of the Lake District
Allerdale